Hari Bahadur Rokaya (born 2 September 1965) is a Nepalese long-distance runner. He competed in the men's marathon at the 1992 Summer Olympics.

References

External links
 

1965 births
Living people
Athletes (track and field) at the 1988 Summer Olympics
Athletes (track and field) at the 1992 Summer Olympics
Nepalese male long-distance runners
Nepalese male marathon runners
Olympic athletes of Nepal
Place of birth missing (living people)
20th-century Nepalese people